Ken Rice may refer to:

 Ken Rice (American football) (1939–2020), former American football offensive tackle
 Spider Webb (jazz drummer) (born 1944), real name Kenneth Rice